Curtis is an unincorporated community in Clark County, Arkansas, United States. Curtis has a post office with ZIP code 71728.

References

Unincorporated communities in Clark County, Arkansas
Unincorporated communities in Arkansas